Ercheia dipterygia is a species of moth of the family Erebidae. It is found on the Andamans.

References

Moths described in 1913
Ercheiini